Marcos Gabriel do Nascimento (born 21 July 1990), known as Marquinhos Gabriel, is a Brazilian footballer. Mainly an attacking midfielder, he can also play as an attacking midfielder for Criciúma, he also can play as a winger.

Club career
Born in Selbach, Rio Grande do Sul, Marquinhos Gabriel joined Internacional's youth setup in 2007, after spells in minor clubs of the same state. He was promoted to the main squad in 2009, and made his senior debut on 5 February, coming on as a late substitute in a 4–1 home routing over Canoas for the Campeonato Gaúcho championship.

Marquinhos Gabriel made his Série A debut on 19 August 2009, replacing Luis Bolaños in a 1–2 home loss against Corinthians. Late in the month he scored his first professional goal, netting the first in a 4–0 home win against Goiás; he finished the campaign with 14 appearances, scoring three goals.

After appearing more sparingly in 2010, Marquinhos Gabriel was loaned to Avaí on 23 February 2011. He was recalled by Colorado on 26 July, after appearing in only five matches for the national league.

On 13 January 2012 Marquinhos Gabriel joined Sport Recife, in a season-long loan deal. After appearing regularly he moved to fellow league team Bahia, also in a temporary deal.

After impressing with the latter during the season, Marquinhos Gabriel signed for Palmeiras on 15 January 2014. On 17 July, however, he left the club and joined Saudi Professional League side Al Nassr.

On 16 January 2015 Marquinhos Gabriel returned to Brazil, signing a one-year loan deal with Santos. He impressed during his time at Peixe, who tried to sign him permanently at the expiration of his loan.

On 18 April 2016, Marquinhos Gabriel joined Corinthians for an undisclosed fee, believed to be US$ 3 million.

Career statistics

Honours
Internacional
 Campeonato Gaúcho: 2009, 2011
 Recopa Sudamericana: 2011

Santos
 Campeonato Paulista: 2015

Corinthians
Campeonato Brasileiro Série A: 2017
Campeonato Paulista: 2017, 2018

References

External links
 

1990 births
Living people
Sportspeople from Rio Grande do Sul
Brazilian footballers
Association football midfielders
Campeonato Brasileiro Série A players
Campeonato Brasileiro Série B players
Sport Club Internacional players
Avaí FC players
Sport Club do Recife players
Esporte Clube Bahia players
Sociedade Esportiva Palmeiras players
Santos FC players
Sport Club Corinthians Paulista players
Cruzeiro Esporte Clube players
Club Athletico Paranaense players
CR Vasco da Gama players
Criciúma Esporte Clube players
Saudi Professional League players
Al Nassr FC players
UAE Pro League players
Al-Nasr SC (Dubai) players
Brazilian expatriate footballers
Brazilian expatriate sportspeople in Saudi Arabia
Brazilian expatriate sportspeople in the United Arab Emirates
Expatriate footballers in Saudi Arabia
Expatriate footballers in the United Arab Emirates